The Museumsquartier (MQ) is a 90,000 m2 large area in the 7th district of the city of Vienna, Austria.

Highlights 
The Museumsquartier contains Baroque buildings as well as Modern architecture by the architects Laurids and Manfred Ortner (Ortner & Ortner Baukunst). The renovation of the former court stables began in April 1998. Three years later, the Museumsquartier opened in two stages (June and September 2001). The total cost of the construction was 150 Million Euro (two billion Austria Schilling).

The MQ is home to a range of installations from large art museums like the Leopold Museum and the MUMOK (Museum of Modern Art Ludwig Foundation Vienna) to contemporary exhibition spaces like the Kunsthalle Wien and festivals like the Wiener Festwochen, an annual summer event that is headquartered in the MuseumsQuartier Wien.

Additional highlights include the Tanzquartier, an international, state-of-the-art centre for dance, the Architekturzentrum Wien, production studios for new media, artist studios for artists-in-residence, outstanding art and cultural facilities designed for children, and a variety of other events and festivals such as the renowned Viennale film festival, the ImPulsTanz Vienna International Dance Festival, Coded Cultures, Techno Sensual, and many others.

The Museumsquartier hosts quartier21, which features around 60 alternative art groups, for example eSeL.

Since 2002, an artist-in-residence programme brought over 735 artists to MuseumsQuartier, who have been working and living in the studio spaces. The residency programme is run together with tranzit.org / ERSTE Stiftung, the Federal Ministry for Europe, Integration and Foreign Affairs and the Research Institute for Arts and Technology.

The Museumsquartier station of line U2 of the Vienna U-Bahn, as well as the metro station "Volkstheater" is located next to the premises.

Controversy 

There was negative media reaction after it became known that the expensive public buildings had serious shortcomings regarding barrier-free wheelchair accessibility. Not even the recently constructed buildings (Kunsthalle, MUMOK and Leopold Museum) were able to fulfill the most basic requirements. After many negative reports across the media, and the commitment of handicapped interest groups, the majority of the problems were repaired in the following years.

Public Netbase, an internet provider and sponsor of electronic art and culture programs, was not invited to be part of Museumsquartier in 2002. Originally located in a part of the MQ, it had to leave during the renovations, but after the construction was completed, it was not able to return to its former premises.

Institutions 

 MUMOK
 Leopold Museum
 Kunsthalle Wien
 ZOOM Kindermuseum
 Tanzquartier
 Architekturzentrum Wien
 Q21
 monochrom
 Modepalast

Gallery

Bibliography 
 Van Uffelen, Chris. Contemporary Museums - Architecture, History, Collections, Braun Publishing, 2010, pages 162-163.

External links 

 Museumsquartier website
 Museumsquartier on Ortner & Ortner Baukunst (The MuseumsQuartier on the website of the architectural firm Ortner & Ortner Baukunst)

Reference List 

Streets in Vienna
Art gallery districts
Museum districts
Museums in Vienna
Buildings and structures in Neubau
Culture in Vienna
Art museums and galleries in Austria
Buildings and structures completed in 2001
Artist residencies
Monochrom